Conchita Martínez was the defending champion and successfully defended her title, by defeating Martina Navratilova 7–6(7–5), 6–4 in the final.

Seeds
The first eight seeds received a bye to the second round.

Draw

Finals

Top half

Section 1

Section 2

Bottom half

Section 3

Section 4

References

External links
 Official results archive (ITF)
 Official results archive (WTA)

Italian Open - Womens Singles, 1994
1994 Italian Open (tennis)